Norton is a community in Kings County, New Brunswick, Canada, formerly an incorporated village. It was likely named for Norton, Massachusetts.

History

On 1 January 2023, Norton annexed all or part of five local service districts to form the new village of Valley Waters. The community's name remains in official use. Revised census figures have not been released.

Geography
It is situated on the Kennebecasis River 55 kilometres northeast of Saint John. The European and North American Railway began serving Norton in 1859. Norton is home to the oldest fossil forest in Canada.

Present day
Family Frolic Days used to be an annual village festival.

Country music singer Chris Cummings and rock musician, Ian Sherwood, of "Down With The Butterfly" and "Acres and Acres" are both natives of Norton.

Norton Elementary School, located at the intersection of Route 121 and Route 124, serves Norton students from kindergarten to grade five.  It is a small, rural school is closely tied with the local community. French immersion is not offered at Norton Elementary but students can be bussed to Sussex Elementary if families wish to enroll students in French immersion before Middle School. Students are bussed to Sussex Middle after grade five and continue on to Sussex Regional High School afterward.

Norton is situated within the shale gas exploration area currently licensed to Corridor Resources.

Demographics 

Notable people

See also
List of communities in New Brunswick
Kings County, New Brunswick
Belleisle, New Brunswick
Cassidy Lake, New Brunswick

References

Further reading
 Lillas Reid, The Road To Norton (1980)

Communities in Kings County, New Brunswick
Former villages in New Brunswick